The 2007–08 Dallas Stars season began on October 3, 2007 and was the franchise's 41st season in the National Hockey League (NHL) and its 15th as the Dallas Stars. The Stars made the Western Conference Finals but failed to represent the Conference in the 2008 Stanley Cup Finals after being defeated by the Detroit Red Wings.

Key dates prior to the start of the season:

The 2007 NHL Entry Draft took place in Columbus, Ohio, on June 22–23.
The free agency period began on July 1.

Regular season

Divisional standings

Conference standings

Schedule and results
 Green background indicates win (2 points).
 Red background indicates regulation loss (0 points).
 White background indicates overtime/shootout loss (1 point).

October

Record: 5–5–2; Home: 3–2–1; Road 2–3–1:

November

Record: 8–4–2; Home: 4–1–1; Road: 4–3–1

December

Record: 10–4–0 ; Home: 5–3–0 ; Road: 5–1–0

January

Record: 5–7–1; Home: 3–3–0; Road: 2–4–1

February

Record: 12–2–0; Home:6–1–0 ; Road: 6–1–0

March

Record: 2–7–2 ; Home: 1–5–0 ; Road: 1–2–2

April

Record: 2–1–0 ; Home: 2–0–0 ; Road: 0–1–0

Playoffs

Western Conference Quarterfinals

Western Conference semifinals

*Game six was the eighth-longest game in NHL history.

Western Conference finals

Player statistics

Regular season

Skaters
Note: GP = Games played; G = Goals; A = Assists; Pts = Points; +/- = Plus/minus; PIM = Penalty minutes; ATOI = Average time on ice

† denotes: Acquired from Tampa Bay in a trade on February 26, 2008

Goaltenders
GP = Games played; TOI = Time on ice (minutes:seconds); W = Wins; L = Losses; SA = Shots against; GA = Goals against; SO = Shutouts; SV% = Save percentage; GAA = Goals against average
{| class="wikitable sortable"
|-
! style="width:12em" | Player
! style="width:4em" | GP
! style="width:5em" | TOI
! style="width:4em" | W
! style="width:4em" | L
! style="width:5em" | SA
! style="width:4em" | GA
! style="width:4em" | SO
! style="width:5em" | SV%
! style="width:5em" | GAA
|-
| || 62 || 3627:31 || 32 || 21 || 1543 || 140 || 3 || .909 || 2.32
|-
| || 21 || 238:28 || 12 || 9 || 88 || 7 || 1 || .920 || 1.76
|-
|† || 2 || 79:59 || 1 || 0 || 35 || 5 || 0 || .857 || 3.75
|-
| || 1 || 60:38 || 0 || 0 || 40 || 2 || 0 || .950 || 1.98
|}
† denotes: Acquired from Tampa Bay in a trade on February 26, 2008Italics denotes: Traded to Tampa Bay in a trade on February 26, 2008

Playoffs

Skaters

Last update: 00:36, 17 May 2008 (UTC)

GoaltendersGP = Games played; TOI = Time on ice (minutes:seconds); W = Wins; L = Losses; SA = Shots against; GA = Goals against; SO = Shutouts; SV% = Save percentage; GAA = Goals against average''

Last update: 00:36, 17 May 2008 (UTC)

Awards and records

Records

Milestones
 On November 7, Mike Modano surpassed Phil Housley's record for most points (1,232) by an American-born player, scoring two goals against the San Jose Sharks.
 Dallas' 2–1 win over Phoenix on February 11 was a franchise-record seventh-straight win.
 Dallas' 2–1 quadruple overtime victory over San Jose in Game 6 of the Western Conference Semifinals was the eighth-longest game in NHL history.  It was the third time in five years Dallas played in a game that reached the fourth overtime.

Transactions
The Stars have been involved in the following transactions during the 2007–08 season.

Trades

Free agents acquired

Free agents lost

Draft picks
Dallas' picks at the 2007 NHL Entry Draft in Columbus, Ohio.  The Stars do not have a first round pick, having dealt it to the Phoenix Coyotes as part of the Ladislav Nagy trade.

Farm teams

Iowa Stars
The Iowa Stars are the Stars American Hockey League affiliate in 2007–08.

Idaho Steelheads
The Idaho Steelheads are the Stars affiliate in the ECHL.

See also
2007–08 NHL season

References

Player stats: Dallas Stars player stats on espn.com
Game log: Dallas Stars game log on espn.com
Team standings: NHL standings on espn.com

Dall
Dall
Dallas Stars seasons